Leslie Michael Grantham (30 April 1947 – 15 June 2018) was an English actor, best known for his role as "Dirty" Den Watts in the BBC soap opera EastEnders. He was a convicted murderer, having served 10 years for the killing of a West German taxi driver, and had significant press coverage resulting from an online sex scandal in 2004.

Early and personal life
Grantham was born in Camberwell, London, the son of Adelaide (née Flinders) and Walter William Grantham (1915–1998). He enlisted in the Royal Fusiliers regiment of the British Army in 1965, at the age of 18.

Grantham married Australian Jane Laurie in 1981. The couple had three sons and divorced in 2013. His son Daniel Laurie is also an actor, and plays Reggie Jackson in Call the Midwife.

Murder conviction
Having joined the Army (The Royal Fusiliers), Grantham was soon posted to West Germany, where he quickly found himself in debt to army colleagues. He resorted to criminal activities in his attempt to clear the debt.

On 3 December 1966, Grantham attempted to rob a taxi driver, Felix Reese, in Osnabrück, Lower Saxony, by threatening him at gunpoint and demanding money. In a struggle between the two men, Reese died after being shot in the head. Grantham was arrested soon after, and charged with murder. 

In his statement to the police following his arrest, Grantham said that he did not know the gun was loaded and it had gone off during the struggle, which would have resulted in a conviction for manslaughter had a jury believed this version of events. However, at his trial in April 1967, he was subsequently convicted of murder and sentenced to life imprisonment. Although he had committed the murder in West Germany, he served the entirety of his sentence in British prisons. This was because soldiers and officers convicted of any criminal offence that warrants a sentence of over two years are automatically transferred to His Majesty's Prison Service, since they are also automatically dishonourably discharged.

Grantham was released in 1977, having served 10 years. While he was in Leyhill Prison in Gloucestershire, he performed in several plays for inmates and members of the public, and edited the prison newspaper. He was encouraged to get more involved in acting professionally by the convicted disgraced Labour Party politician T. Dan Smith, who was also an inmate at Leyhill in the mid-1970s. He also met actress Louise Jameson during her visit to Leyhill near the end of his imprisonment; she had also encouraged him to take up acting and he became good friends with her.

Career

Early work
On release from prison, Grantham decided to pursue an acting career and trained at the Webber Douglas Academy of Dramatic Art. His theatre work included a role in a play at the Battersea Free Theatre written by television director Matthew Robinson. In 1982, Grantham made his television debut as Boollie in a BBC2 Playhouse edition called "Jake's End". The following year he appeared as Frank on an episode of the short lived sitcom Goodnight and God Bless. Grantham was then cast by Matthew Robinson as Kiston, the henchman of Davros, in the Doctor Who serial Resurrection of the Daleks (1984). He also played a signals sergeant in episode 12 of the television mini-series The Jewel in the Crown (1984) and wrote a play entitled A Reason To Live, which won the Gloucester Drama Festival award for best original play. He made a brief appearance in the Mike Hodges film Morons from Outer Space (1985), but by the time the film was released Grantham had gained his best known role.

EastEnders
In 1984, Grantham auditioned with the BBC for a part in its new soap opera EastEnders, which aired in February 1985. He was recommended by Matthew Robinson, who was to become a key member of the EastEnders production team. Grantham had auditioned for the role of market trader Pete Beale, but he was offered the part of Den Watts. The character, landlord of The Queen Victoria public house, quickly became a national favourite and gained the nickname Dirty Den mostly because of the awful way he treated his wife Angie, played by Anita Dobson, with one of his many affairs occurring at the age of 39, when he fathered a child with 16-year-old Michelle Fowler, played by Susan Tully.

On 25 December 1986, Grantham's character served his on-screen wife with divorce papers, with the famous line "Happy Christmas, Ange."  The episode was watched by a record 30 million viewers – over half the British population.  In 1988, the character sold his pub to Frank Butcher, played by Mike Reid, and gradually drifted out of key storylines until finally departing in February 1989, although his final scenes had been filmed the previous autumn.  Grantham had announced his intention to leave the soap early in 1988, around the same time that it was announced that Dobson would be leaving.  However, the series’ bosses had not wanted to suffer the double blow of losing its two biggest characters so close together, and set about an intensive block of filming that would allow Den to remain on screen into 1989, while enabling Grantham to remain on EastEnders only until the previous autumn.

Den had become involved with a criminal organisation called "The Firm" over the summer of 1988, and his only option was to flee The Square.  After a spell on remand in custody and a dramatic escape from the police and from members of The Firm who ambushed him on his way to court, viewers watched a mysterious gunman shoot at Den with a gun hidden in a bunch of daffodils, before hearing a splash.  A shot depicting Den's death was cut from the final scene, in the hope that Grantham might one day be persuaded to return to the role.  The following year, a body believed to be Den's was found in the canal.

Other work
Grantham played Danny Kane in the crime television series The Paradise Club (1989–90) alongside Don Henderson.

He went on to appear in the fourth season of Cluedo as Colonel Mustard, He previously appeared as a contestant on the 1990 Christmas special. In the second episode of the fourth season, Col. Mike Mustard murdered former comrade and property developer Sir Nigel Hussey (Ian McNeice) with a G-string in the kitchen. A short time after the episode aired, the producers received a letter that was written by the family of one Felix Reese, who himself was a taxi driver who was shot in the head by Leslie Grantham while he was a soldier stationed in Germany. The Reeses found it distasteful that someone who performed an illegal killing as a soldier would be cast as someone who performed an illegal killing as a soldier.

He also appeared on The Detectives (1993) and 99-1 (1994–95). In 1994, he narrated volume one of Frank Harris's erotic classic My Life and Loves. In 1997, he produced and starred in the sci-fi mini-series The Uninvited.

Alongside Melinda Messenger, Grantham was the co-host of the game show Fort Boyard from 1998 to 2001. Also in 2001, he appeared in Lily Savage's Blankety Blank. He also reunited with his EastEnders co-star Anita Dobson in the two-part mini-series The Stretch which aired on Sky One in 2000, and in the British gangster film Charlie (2004).

Return to EastEnders
During the 1990s, Grantham was approached more than once by BBC bosses about a possible return to EastEnders, but rejected each of these offers, often feeling that the storyline at the time would not be the right one to suit any potential comeback.

However, on 3 May 2003, it was confirmed that Grantham would be returning to EastEnders later that year to reprise his role as Den after 14 years. On 29 September 2003, his return to EastEnders was aired, with him arriving at the nightclub E20 now owned by his adopted daughter Sharon, portrayed by Letitia Dean.

It was revealed that Den had survived the shooting and fled to Spain with the help of former mistress Jan Hammond (Jane How), while the body found a year later in the canal had been wrongly identified. Over 17 million people watched one of the most anticipated television events of the year on 29 September, as Den spoke the famous words, "Hello, princess."

There had been much speculation in the media after Den's departure as to whether the character really was dead – particularly after the original search of the canal site where he was shot failed to uncover any trace of him. BBC bosses said that Den's return had been on the agenda almost every year since the character's departure in 1989, and the first offer for him to return had been made as long ago as 1991. Grantham had turned down every offer to return until that which was made to him in early 2003, feeling that his character did not have adequate links to the show for a comeback to be anything more than an attempt to boost ratings – particularly when Den's daughter Sharon was away from 1995 to 2001, leaving Den without any family in the cast. By 2003, however, his daughter Vicki, played by Scarlett Alice Johnson, had rejoined the cast and a previously unknown son called Dennis Rickman, played by Nigel Harman, was also in the series – the product of an affair between Den and a young woman called Paula Rickman, 30 years earlier.

In December 2004, Den arranged a scam to get back The Queen Vic from Sam Mitchell (Kim Medcalf), 16 years after he had sold it to Frank.

Online sex scandal
In May 2004, a Sunday newspaper printed photographs of Grantham exposing himself and masturbating whilst sucking his finger in a sexually-suggestive manner via a webcam from his dressing room to an undercover reporter named "Amanda". Grantham also allegedly dressed as Captain Hook whilst pleasuring himself, and insulted several cast members of EastEnders, including Shane Richie (Alfie Moon), Wendy Richard (Pauline Fowler), Kim Medcalf (Sam Mitchell) and Jessie Wallace (Kat Moon). Grantham released a statement which read, "I am wholeheartedly ashamed of my behaviour and feel that I have let down my colleagues, as well as my friends and family." He also added, "In some small recompense I intend to make a donation to charity as a mark of my apology."  He maintained in later interviews that he 'was set up'. He attempted suicide three times as a result of the scandal. In addition, in 2018 it was reported that he had been investigated by police for sexually abusing a school girl, although the victim ultimately decided not to pursue the matter.

Departure from EastEnders
In November 2004, it was confirmed that Grantham would be leaving EastEnders in the New Year. Bosses stated that the character would be killed off, but this time "the coffin lid would be nailed shut".

On 18 February 2005, 16.2 million viewers tuned in to view his character's second demise, this time at the hands of second wife Chrissie, portrayed by Tracy-Ann Oberman, who hit him over the head with a dog-shaped iron doorstop during a confrontation in the Vic.

After EastEnders
Grantham later appeared in two UK tours of Beyond Reasonable Doubt, a stage adaptation of a Jeffrey Archer play, alongside Simon Ward and Alexandra Bastedo, and performed as a Christmas pantomime villain. He directed and starred in a pantomime of Peter Pan at the Alban Arena in St Albans during Christmas 2005, which was a sell-out and received excellent reviews. After Grantham left EastEnders in 2005, he spoke out publicly against the show, criticising its over-the-top, far-fetched storylines, saying 'there was a murder every week... that's not real life'.

In October 2006, it was announced that, in his first television role since leaving EastEnders, he would appear in the long-running ITV1 police drama series The Bill, playing the role of Jimmy Collins, who was on the run from prison. The episode aired on 8 February 2007. This was Grantham's second appearance in The Bill as he previously appeared in a few episodes in 1998 and a single episode in 1999 also coincidentally playing another character named Jimmy.

In February 2010, Grantham appeared in EastEnders: The Aftermath on BBC Three to mark the live episode of the show and its 25th birthday. He was interviewed by Kirsten O'Brien from the bar of The Queen Victoria pub which his character had once owned. Grantham was cast for the lead role in the UK thriller movie DeadTime.

From 28 November to 11 December 2010, Grantham appeared as Ebenezer Scrooge in the Lincoln Theatre Royal's production of A Christmas Carol. He portrayed the main character John in the Bulgarian TV series The English Neighbour, based on the novel of the same name. In 2015 he appeared in the film Mob Handed (2016 Release) directed by Liam Galvin playing a detective.

Death
In June 2018, it was reported Grantham had returned to the United Kingdom from his home in Bulgaria to receive treatment for lung cancer. He died on 15 June 2018, aged 71. That evening's episode of EastEnders featured a tribute to Grantham, whilst his co-star and on-screen wife Anita Dobson described him as "a wonderful and special actor, witty and very talented. I shall remember him very fondly and with affection."

Selected filmography
Vengeance (2020) – Ronnie
The Krays: Dead Man Walking – Nipper Read
Jack southeast (2018) – The boss
Silenced: Georgi Markov and the Umbrella Murder (2013) – Narrator (English version)
The English Neighbour (2011) – John
The Bill (2007) – Jimmy Collins (1 episode)
Charlie (2004) – Richard Waldeck
Heartbeat (2002) – George East (1 episode)
The Stretch (2000) – Terry Greene
Bernard's Watch (1999) – Mr. Rattle (Series 3; Episode 13)
The Bill  (1998) – Jimmy Smith (4 episodes)
Fort Boyard (1998–2001) – Boyard (57 episodes)
Wycliffe (1997) – Patrick Durno (1 episode)
The Uninvited (1997) – Philip Gates
99-1 (1994–95) – Mick Raynor
The Detectives (1993) – Danny Kane (1 episode)
Cluedo (1993) – Colonel Mustard (6 episodes)
Woof! (1992) – Mr Flint (1 episode)
The Grove Family (1991) – Bob Grove (1 episode)
The Paradise Club (1989–1990) – Danny Kane (20 episodes)
Winners and Losers (1989) – Eddie Burt (3 episodes)
Alas Smith & Jones (1986) – (1 episode)
EastEnders (1985–1989, 2003–2005) – "Dirty" Den Watts (562 episodes)
Morons from Outer Space (1985) – motorway policeman
Dramarama (1984) – Mo's dad (1 episode)
The Jewel in the Crown (1984) – signals sergeant
Doctor Who: Resurrection of the Daleks (1984) – Kiston (2 episodes)
 Goodnight and God Bless (1983) – Frank (1 episode)

References

External links

 
 Audio Interview at BBC Wiltshire

1947 births
2018 deaths
Military personnel from London
20th-century British Army personnel
20th-century English criminals
Alumni of the Webber Douglas Academy of Dramatic Art
Audiobook narrators
BBC people
Criminals from London
English autobiographers
English male criminals
English male soap opera actors
English male stage actors
English people convicted of murder
English people imprisoned abroad
English prisoners sentenced to life imprisonment
Male actors from London
People convicted of murder by Germany
People from Camberwell
People paroled from life sentence
Place of death missing
Prisoners sentenced to life imprisonment by Germany
Royal Fusiliers soldiers
Sex scandals